Fadel Muhammad Alhaddar He was appointed as the governor of the then-newest Indonesian province, Gorontalo, for the period 2001–2006. In 2006, he won the first Gorontalo gubernatorial election, making him governor until 2011. From October 22, 2009-2011, he was the Minister of Maritime Affairs and Fisheries in President Susilo Bambang Yudhoyono cabinet.

Education and career
During his study at the department of engineering physics, Bandung Institute of Technology (ITB), he was actively involved in various student bodies and was honored with an Outstanding Student award in 1975.

After obtaining his degree in 1978, he entered the business world and together with a few fellow graduates set up a pioneering engineering company, PT Bukaka Teknik Utama, Tbk.. The company, which first manufactured fire trucks and construction equipment, has expanded and diversified to become a leader in the Indonesian engineering and manufacturing industry. And today, the company, which became a publicly listed company in 1994, is concentrating on infrastructure sectors, especially in the field of energy, transportation, and telecommunication.

After having completely resigned his presidency from Bukaka Group in 1997, he became the owner of GEMA Group holding some joint venture companies such as PT Bayer Urethanes Indonesia (polyol manufacturer), PT Gema SemCorp Engineering (steel fabricator), PT Dowell Anadrill Schlumberger (cementing services and rental equipment for drilling on oil and gas), plus the publishing companies Warta Ekonomi and Mobil Motor. He was also President Commissioner of INTAN Group (Insurances).

He has attended various seminars and conferences on management, finance, economics, engineering, in Indonesia and overseas. He was also a vice president of the Indonesian Chamber of Commerce and Industry (KADIN).

Since 1992, he has been appointed as a member of MPR-RI (People's Consultative Assembly of the Republic of Indonesia), and he was also elected as the Chief Treasurer of Golkar Party.

On December 10, 2001, he was appointed as the governor of Gorontalo Province for the period 2001–2006, and in 2006 he won the Gorontalo gubernatorial election, making him governor until 2011. After his inauguration as Minister of Maritime Affairs and Fisheries by President Susilo Bambang Yudhoyono on October 22, 2009, he appointed Deputy Governor Gusnar Ismail to replace him as Governor of Gorontalo until 2011.

In 2007 he accomplished his doctorate in public administration, magna cum laude, from University of Gadjah Mada, Yogyakarta From 2009 to 2011, he was pointed as Minister of Maritime and Fisheries Affairs.

Personal life
Fadel Muhammad Alhaddar was born in Ternate, North Maluku on 20 May 1952 of Arab-Indonesian descent. He was married to Hana Hasanah, a former senator from Gorontalo (member of the Regional Representative Council) from 2009 to 2014 and 2014–2019. From his marriage to Hana, he has a daughter named Nayla Salsabila Fadel. Fadel has four other children from a marriage to his former wife Astrid Fadel Muhammad, namely Fikri Fadel Muhammad, Faiz Fadel Muhammad, Jehan Nabila Fadel, and Fauzan Fadel Muhammad.

References

External links
 Fadel Muhammad in TokohIndonesia.com
 Provinsi Gorontalo

Living people
1952 births
People from Ternate
Indonesian people of Yemeni descent
Governors of Gorontalo (province)
Government ministers of Indonesia
Golkar politicians